The Acielle was a  wooden ketch that was wrecked  south of Smoky Cape, New South Wales on 11 September 1929.

Service history 
The Acielle was launched in Tasmania, and sold to Mr Lebbeus Hordern of Sydney, who is credited with first having brought seaplanes to Australian waters. Hordern used the Acielle as a parent ship for his seaplane, and named her after his survey company, ACL (Aerial Company Limited). In 1921, Hordern purchased another four seaplanes, two Curtiss three-seater 'Seagull' flying boats, a ten-seater Short twin engined craft, and a Short sporting seaplane. With no expense spared, he equipped the Acielle and set out to complete the first aerial navigation of the entire Australian coastline, covering around 150 miles per day.

Eventually the Acielle was sold on again, and was next used as a pleasure yacht, then refitted by the Australian Iron and Steel Company for a trip to investigate iron ore deposits on the northwest coast of Australia.

Shipwreck event 

It was during this expedition, two days out from Sydney en route to Derby, Western Australia, on 11 September 1929, that the Acielle foundered in a strong southeasterly gale.

The vessel was valued at £2500 and was insured.

Wreck site and wreckage 
The Kempsey Heritage Inventory states that the ship's anchor at the Heritage Hotel of Gladstone, Kempsey, is believed to have come from the Acielle. The anchor is believed to have lain under the sand but was frequently exposed by sea movement. The anchor was dragged from the sand by a member of the Jordan family who is a fisherman at Hat Head. In 1974, it was transported to Gladstone Hotel (now renamed to the Heritage Hotel) and accepted by Jim Tedd, the then publican of Gladstone Hotel. It was placed in the garden of the hotel and remains there.

References 

Shipwrecks of the Mid North Coast Region
1908 ships
Maritime incidents in 1929
1901 – World War I ships of Australia
Interwar period ships of Australia
Ketches of Australia
Ships built in Tasmania